A tiller is a lever to provide leverage for the helmsman to turn the rudder of a ship.
Tiller may also refer to:

Animals
Tiller (horse) (born 1974), an American thoroughbred racehorse

Archery
Tiller, the stock of a crossbow
Tiller, the difference between the limb-string distances measured where the limbs are attached to the riser (Recurve bow)
Tiller, the device a bowyer (maker of bows) uses to see if the bending of the bow limbs is equal

Mechanical
Tiller (automobile), a steering device present on some very early automobiles before the steering wheel
Tiller (aircraft), a small steering wheel in the cockpit of an aircraft used to steer the nose wheel
Tiller truck, a fire truck with separate steering wheels for front and rear wheels
Rotary tiller, a garden implement used for turning soil (or the person who operates such a device)

Places
 Tiller, Norway, a former municipality that is now part of Trondheim municipality in Trøndelag county, Norway
 Tiller, Oregon, an unincorporated community in Douglas County, Oregon in the United States
 Tiller Ranger Station, a United States Forest Service compound in Oregon's Umpqua National Forest
 Tiller Church, a church in the city of Trondheim in Trøndelag county, Norway
 Tiller School, a non-profit charter school serving kindergarten through fifth grade in Beaufort, North Carolina
 Tiller Upper Secondary School, a school in Trondheim municipality in Trøndelag county, Norway

Plants
Tiller (botany), a stem produced by grass plants, and refers to all shoots that grow after the initial parent shoot grows from a seed

People
 Andrew Tiller (born 1989), American football guard for the New Orleans Saints of the National Football League (NFL)
 Bill Tiller (born 1967), American computer game designer, writer, and artist
 Bjørn Tiller (born 1959), Norwegian chess player
 Bryson Tiller (born 1993), American singer, songwriter and rapper
 Carl Frode Tiller (born 1970), Norwegian author, historian and musician
 Chris Tiller (born 1978), former Major League Baseball umpire
 David Tiller (born 1958), former Australian rules footballer in the South Australian National Football League
 David Tiller (professor), Australian Professor of Medicine
 George Tiller (1941–2009), murdered American abortion doctor
 Gerald Tiller, a member of Dem Franchize Boyz rap group
 Henry Tiller (1914–1999), Norwegian boxer who competed in the 1936 Summer Olympics
 J. T. Tiller (born 1988), American professional basketball player
 Joe Tiller (1942–2017), American football player and coach
 John Tiller (1854–1925), musical theatre director
 John Tiller (priest) (born 1938), Anglican priest and author
 Kate Tiller, reader emerita in English local history at Kellogg College, University of Oxford
 Kelvin Tiller (born 1990), American mixed martial artist
 Morgan Tiller (1918–1983), American football player and coach
 Nadja Tiller (1929–2023), Austrian actress
 Rasmus Tiller (born 1996), Norwegian cyclist
 Robert Tiller (born 1949), Canadian Thoroughbred racehorse trainer
 Sharon Tiller, American film maker who has numerous film and television credits as a writer, director, and producer
 Stephen Tiller (born 1987), Australian rules footballer for the Western Bulldogs of the AFL
 Terence Tiller (1916–1987), English poet and radio producer
 Tony Tiller (born 1981), former American football cornerback
 William A. Tiller, professor emeritus of materials science and engineering at Stanford University
 Tiller Girls, a popular dance troupe of the 1890s in England

Sports
 Tiller IL, A Norwegian sports club

Other
Tiller Systems (software), a leading cloud-based iPad point of sale (POS) software company headquartered in Paris, France

See also
 Tilley (disambiguation)